Uchku Mach'ay (Quechua uchku hole, mach'ay cave, "hole cave", also spelled Uchcomachay) is a mountain in the Andes of Peru which reaches a height of approximately . It lies in the Junín Region, Tarma Province, Tarma District.

References 

Mountains of Peru
Mountains of Junín Region